Aosa is a genus of flowering plants belonging to the family Loasaceae.

Its native range is Caribbean, Central America to Colombia, Brazil.

Species:

Aosa gilgiana 
Aosa grandis 
Aosa parviflora 
Aosa plumieri 
Aosa rupestris 
Aosa sigmoidea

References

Loasaceae
Cornales genera